Peter Frank Allam (born 25 July 1959) is a British competitive sailor and Olympic medalist. He won a bronze medal in the Flying Dutchman class at the 1984 Summer Olympics in Los Angeles, together with Jonathan Richards.

Peter Allam is Chief Executive of the Weymouth and Portland National Sailing Academy  venue for the sailing events of the London 2012 Olympic Games

References

External links 
 
 
 

1959 births
Living people
British male sailors (sport)
Sailors at the 1984 Summer Olympics – Flying Dutchman
Sailors at the 1992 Summer Olympics – Flying Dutchman
Olympic sailors of Great Britain
Olympic bronze medallists for Great Britain
Olympic medalists in sailing
Medalists at the 1984 Summer Olympics
20th-century British people